Aure sur Mer is a commune in the department of Calvados, northwestern France. The municipality was established on 1 January 2017 by merger of the former communes of Sainte-Honorine-des-Pertes (the seat) and Russy.

See also 
Communes of the Calvados department

References 

Communes of Calvados (department)
Populated coastal places in France